Anakhina is a rural locality in Chernitsynsky Selsoviet Rural Settlement, Oktyabrsky District, Kursk Oblast, Russia. Population:

Geography 
The village is located on the Seym River (a left tributary of the Desna), 76 km from the Russia–Ukraine border, 11 km south-west of Kursk, 2 km east of the district center – the urban-type settlement Pryamitsyno, at the еаstern border of the selsoviet center – Chernitsyno.

 Streets
There are the following streets in the locality: Druzhby, Internatsionalnaya, Narodnaya, Prigorodnaya, Priseymskaya, Shkolnaya, Shkolny pereulok, Solnechnaya, Stepnaya, Yunosti, Yuzhny pereulok, Vostochnaya, Zheleznodorozhnaya and Zelyonaya (510 houses).

 Climate
Anakhina has a warm-summer humid continental climate (Dfb in the Köppen climate classification).

Transport 
Anakhina is located 3.5 km from the federal route  Crimea Highway (a part of the European route ), on the road of regional importance  (Kursk – Lgov – Rylsk – border with Ukraine), 3 km from the nearest railway station Dyakonovo (railway line Lgov I — Kursk).

The rural locality is situated 22 km from Kursk Vostochny Airport, 118 km from Belgorod International Airport and 223 km from Voronezh Peter the Great Airport.

References

Notes

Sources

Rural localities in Oktyabrsky District, Kursk Oblast